Srihatta Literary Society or commonly known as Shrihatta Sahitya Parishad is the oldest literary and cultural organization in the Sylhet region. The organization was founded in 1935. As the first cultural organization in the region, it made a significant contribution to the creation of poet and litterateur at that time; Its contribution to the creation of writers like Achyut Charan Choudhury or Dewan Mohammad Azraf is noteworthy.

References  

Organisations based in Sylhet
1935 establishments in India
Literary societies